Kimberly Drew is an American art influencer and writer. She is best known as the former social media manager for the Metropolitan Museum of Art and her use of the social media handle MuseumMammy. Drew released her first book, This Is What I Know About Art in June 2020, as part of a children series from Penguin, and published an anthology titled Black Futures with New York Times staff writer Jenna Wortham in December 2020.

Early life and education
Drew grew up in Orange, New Jersey in a family of artists. In 2008, she graduated from the boarding school St. George's School in Middletown, Rhode Island. During her second year at Smith College, Drew had an internship at Studio Museum in Harlem with Thelma Golden, which influenced her later choice of concentration and informed her career path. In 2012, Drew graduated from Smith College with a B.A. in Art history and Africana studies, and a concentration in Museum Studies.

Career

In March 2011, Drew started the Tumblr blog Black Contemporary Art while still in college. She and others posted about black artists who were featured on museum websites but had no digital presence on Tumblr, so that they "were part of a recorded history." Drew has referred to herself as a "a curator of "black art and experiences" and has been recognized by Artsy for advocating for racial equality in the art world. She has spoken about the importance of tying art to activism and protests, specifically in the immediate aftermath of the high-profile murders of Black Americans such as George Floyd and Ahmaud Arbery, and the shootings of Breonna Taylor and Tony McDade.

In July 2015, Drew was hired as the Associate Online Community Producer at the Metropolitan Museum of Art in New York City. She held the position until November 2019.

In 2016, Drew curated the White House's Instagram account during the 2016 South by South Lawn festival. That July, Drew, along with writers Taylor Renee Aldridge and Jessica Lynne and art historian Jessica Bell Brown, organized a project called Black Art Incubator, a two-month long program of book exchanges, art critiques, and panel discussions.

In 2018, Drew modeled for the Chromat Spring/Summer 2019 runway during New York Fashion Week.

In February 2022, the Pace Gallery announced that Drew would be joining as Associate Director.

Books

Beginning their connection through Twitter’s direct-messaging, Drew co-edited and released the anthology Black Futures with journalist Jenna Wortham. After five years in the making, the collective book encapsulates a multitude of art forms by more than 100 Black creators responding to the question, “What does it mean to be Black and alive, right now?” Their creation stamps a time when the height of Black empowerment coexists with longing systemic oppression. Drew and Wortham’s goal is to bring to light how Black culture surrounds everyday society and how Blackness is limitless. Black Futures was published by Chris Jackson's One World imprint at Random House in December 2020.

On June 2, 2020, Drew released her first book, This Is What I Know About Art, a book for young adults under the Penguin Workshop imprint.

Personal life
Drew resides in Brooklyn and is a lesbian. Her partner is Chase Strangio, a civil rights lawyer.

References

External links
Black Contemporary Art blog
Kimberly Drew on Instagram

Year of birth missing (living people)
Living people
21st-century American women
21st-century African-American women writers
21st-century American women writers
21st-century African-American writers
People associated with the Metropolitan Museum of Art
Smith College alumni
American women bloggers
American bloggers
American art curators
American women curators
African-American activists
People from Orange, New Jersey
American LGBT writers
LGBT African Americans
Queer writers
Activists from New Jersey
St. George's School (Rhode Island) alumni